The 28 August 2011 Baghdad bombing was an attack by the Islamic State of Iraq at the Umm al-Qura Mosque in western Baghdad. A suicide bomber wearing a fake cast on his arm walked into the building and blew himself up inside the main hall, killing 32 people including parliamentarian Khalid al-Fahdawi. The attack took place near the end of the holy fasting month of Ramadan. The mosque is the largest place of worship for Sunni Muslims in the capital and the main headquarters of the Sunni Endowment. The organization is responsible for maintaining Sunni Muslim religious sites across Baghdad.

See also

 List of terrorist incidents, 2011

References 

2011 murders in Iraq
21st-century mass murder in Iraq
Mass murder in 2011
2011 in Iraq
Terrorist incidents in Baghdad
Suicide bombings in Baghdad
Terrorist incidents in Iraq in 2011
Islamic terrorist incidents in 2011
2010s in Baghdad
August 2011 events in Iraq
Attacks on religious buildings and structures in Iraq
Building bombings in Iraq